The Klezmer Conservatory Band is a Boston-based group which performs traditional klezmer music; it was formed by Hankus Netsky of the New England Conservatory of Music in 1980. Originally formed for a single concert, they have gone on to release eleven albums.

Netsky is the grandson and nephew of traditional klezmer musicians. He was inspired by jam sessions with Irish musicians to attempt something with klezmer music. He recruited many of the musicians from the New England Conservatory of Music's Third Stream department with the majority having jazz or folk backgrounds.

In 1988, the band featured in a documentary on klezmer called A Jumpin Night in the Garden of Eden. It has also provided soundtracks for a number of films and theatrical productions including:

 Enemies, a Love Story
 Joel Grey's Yiddish music review Berschtcapades '94
 The Fool and the Flying Ship, narrated by Robin Williams
 Shlemiel the First, a musical based on a play by Isaac Bashevis Singer

External links
Official website
[ Allmusic article]
 Frank London on the Klezmer Conservatory Band

Klezmer groups
Musical groups from Boston